Al-Yaarubiyah is a town in al-Hasakah Governorate, Syria. According to the Syria Central Bureau of Statistics (CBS), Al-Yaarubiyah had a population of 6,066 in the 2004 census. It is the administrative center of a nahiyah ("subdistrict") consisting of 62 localities with a combined population of 39,459 in 2004.

Its population are mostly Arabs of the Shammar tribe. In the course of the civil war, the town initially came under the control of jihadist rebels, including the al-Nusra Front and the Islamic State, but was later captured by the YPG, bringing it into the AANES.

Border post
The town was the border post between French-Syria and British-Iraq and had a railway station on the Baghdad Railway.

It is twinned by Rabia on the Iraqi side of the border.

References

Populated places in al-Malikiyah District
Towns in al-Hasakah Governorate